Valeria Golino (born 22 October 1965) is an Italian actress and film director. She is best known to English-language audiences for her roles in Rain Man, Big Top Pee-wee and the two Hot Shots! films, particularly the olive-in-the-belly-button scene. In addition to David di Donatello, Silver Ribbon, Golden Ciak and Italian Golden Globe awards, she is one of four actresses to have twice won the Best Actress award at the Venice Film Festival.

Early life
Golino was born in Naples, Italy, the daughter of an Italian father who was a Germanist scholar, and a Greek mother, Lalla, who was a painter. One of her grandmothers was Egyptian-French. She grew up in an "artistic household", and after her parents split up, was raised alternating between Athens and Sorrento (near Naples). Golino is the niece of the journalist Enzo Golino at L'Espresso, and her brother is a musician. When she was a girl, her mother frequently took her to the cinema, and she quickly became interested in films. In spite of this, though, she never thought about pursuing a film career until she made her first movie. Instead, she wanted to be a cardiologist.
Valeria was diagnosed with scoliosis at age 11, and she had to have a steel rod implanted in her back for five years. She remained in the care of a surgeon in Chicago for six months, where she learned to speak English. At age 14, she started to work as a fashion model in Athens, Milan, London, and Los Angeles. She was in TV commercials for beer, perfume, and cosmetics, and she modeled swimsuits and blue jeans. Being an unfocused student, she dropped out of high school after acting in her first movie.

Career

1983–1987
Golino never formally studied acting. Her career started by chance when her uncle Enzo received a phone call from the director Lina Wertmüller, who was searching for a young girl for her movie, and encouraged Golino to go to Wertmuller's house to meet her.

The two met and Valeria was eventually cast in her first film, A Joke of Destiny (1983), alongside Ugo Tognazzi after an audition where she performed Shakespeare. Despite her parents' reservations and Wertmuller's demanding on-set behavior, she liked the experience so much that she decided to pursue an acting career. She gave up modeling, which she had never found fulfilling or interesting, and started to study diction and elocution. Among her early auditions were Una spina nel cuore (an audition that she called "distasteful") and The Name of the Rose but was passed over for both films. She was offered roles in Giochi d'estate (1984) and other similarly themed romantic films about teenagers, but she turned them down to focus on smaller and more challenging projects.

She followed her first with a string of independent films, including roles in My Dearest Son and Little Flames (both 1985), her first leading role, both of which won her a Golden Globe award for Best Breakthrough Actress. Later that year, she was involved in a car accident which displaced the metal bar  in her back and had to have surgery in order to fix it: she was bedridden for five months.

Her star-making role came the following year, when she played the life-loving cleaning lady who romances two different men in Storia d'amore (A Tale of Love) by Francesco Maselli. Her performance received rave reviews and earned her two prizes at the 1986 Venice Film Festival, the official Best Actress award (now called Volpi Cup) and the Golden Ciak award. The same film also won her the oldest and most prestigious critics' prize of the Italian cinema, the Silver Ribbon award for Best Actress.

Her following projects were once again independent, auteur-driven films, The Gold Rimmed Glasses and Three Sisters. She was supposed to reunite with Maselli for his following film L'uomo della casa di fronte, co-starring Marcello Mastroianni, but the project never happened. The same director then moved on to another film, Codice privato, and Golino turned down the role that was eventually played by Ornella Muti.

1988–present
She moved to Los Angeles and began to work in Hollywood, with the movie Big Top Pee-wee (1988). She was cast in Rain Man (also 1988) as Susanna, the girlfriend of Tom Cruise's character, and in the comedy films Hot Shots! (1991) and Hot Shots! Part Deux (1993), as the girlfriend of the hero (Hot Shots! was a direct spoof of Top Gun). Her character's nationality in Rain Man was changed from American to Italian-American to accommodate her accent. Even though she was known as a dramatic actress in Italy, most of the offers she received in Hollywood were for comedies.

Golino auditioned for lead roles in Pretty Woman and Flatliners, but both times she lost the part to Julia Roberts during the final audition. She was first runner-up for both roles and, in the case of Pretty Woman, she revealed many years later: "I was in the running until the final audition: it came down to Julia Roberts and me. The director asked us to walk in the same corridor, wearing the same clothes and makeup. As soon as I saw her [Roberts], I knew that she would have been chosen. And since she knew that, she told me: 'Go and get them, big mama!' I wouldn't have dared to say that to my rival. I would have been good in that film but she was perfect". She also turned down the leading role in the Ken Loach film Hidden Agenda, which she called "an offer that I still regret having declined".

In 1993, she was heavily involved in producing and starring in an independent feature film, Cat in the Box, which was never made, and because of that project, she was forced to turn down a role in a movie directed by Carlo Verdone.

During the following year, she was offered the leading role in True Lies, but she had to turn that down because of conflicts in scheduling with I Sfagi tou kokora (1996), an independent film made in Cyprus. She had joined this film project in 1992, while it was still in preproduction, and she fervently wanted to be a part of it. Later on that year, she was supposed to act with Gian Maria Volonté in the film Treni sull'acqua. This project would have marked her third collaboration with the director Peter Del Monte, but it was canceled after the death of Volonté.

In early 1996, she was supposed to play a journalist in the film Bravo Randy, directed by Alessandro D'Alatri and also starring Jovanotti in the titular role of a tramp who falls into a coma after an accident. However, the project fell apart just a few months before shooting was slated to begin: fearing a lack of influence, the Italian production company blocked the funds as the film would have been shot in California.

In January 2001, she was supposed to star with Claudio Amendola in a TV mini-series called Cuore di ghiaccio, directed by Luciano Casciani, produced by Mediaset and set in Cefalù, but the project never took off the ground.

She had a supporting role in the successful French thriller 36, Quai des Orfèvres (2004) and a leading role in Cash (2008), although the producers of the film had wanted Kristin Scott Thomas instead. Her role as Irene in Sacred Heart (2004) had been written specifically for her by director Ferzan Ozpetek, but she was forced to abandon the project for personal reasons. She was replaced by Barbora Bobuľová.

In 2005, she was offered the leading role in Fine pena mai (2008) but she turned it down, considering herself to be too old for the part. The role was eventually played by Valentina Cervi.

In 2006, Theodoros Angelopoulos cast her in The Dust of Time (2008) after being impressed by Golino's work in Respiro. However the many delays in the shooting forced her to drop out of the project in late 2007 for scheduling conflicts. She was replaced by Irène Jacob.

In 2009, she was the subject of the monograph Valeria Golino: Respiro d'attrice by Massimo Causo.

The following year she was offered the chance to direct a short film by the company Pasta Garofalo, Armandino e il Madre, for which she also wrote the script. Her first feature film as director, Honey (2013), was screened in the Un Certain Regard section at the 2013 Cannes Film Festival and won a commendation from the Ecumenical Jury.

She played Armida Miserere, high security warden in Like the Wind (2013) directed by Marco Simon Puccioni a difficult leading role praised by the critics and awarded in festival.

Despite her self-deprecating reluctance, she also sang in several films, most notably her English-language films Hot Shots! and Big Top Pee-wee and in Italian in Like the Wind. She recorded two LPs in 1987, the song "Maybe Once More" for L'inverno and 'Piangi Roma' for Giulia Doesn't Date at Night (featuring Baustelle), the latter of which won her a Silver Ribbon award for Best Song.

She is a member of AMPAS thanks to the invitation of Jack Lemmon and Walter Matthau.

In 2016, she was a member of the main competition jury of the 2016 Cannes Film Festival.

Filmography

Acting

A Joke of Destiny (1983)
Blind Date (1984) – Girl in bikini
My Dearest Son (1985) – Francesca
Little Flames (1985) – Mara
A Tale of Love (1986) – Bruna Assecondati
Detective School Dropouts (1986) – Caterina
Dernier été à Tanger (1987) – Claudia Marchetti
The Gold Rimmed Glasses (1987) – Nora Treves
Three Sisters (1988) – Sandra Parini
Big Top Pee-wee (1988) – Gina Piccolapupula
Rain Man (1988) – Susanna
Torrents of Spring (1989) – Gemma Rosselli
Traces of an Amorous Life (1990)
The King's Whore (1990) – Jeanne de Luynes
Hot Shots! (1991) – Ramada Thompson
The Indian Runner (1991) – Maria
Year of the Gun (1991) – Lia
Puerto Escondido (1992) – Anita
Hot Shots! Part Deux (1993) – Ramada Rodham Hayman
Clean Slate (1994) – Sarah Novak/Beth Holly
Like Two Crocodiles (1994) – Marta
Immortal Beloved (1994) – Giulietta Guicciardi
Fallen Angels (TV series) – episode Red Wind (1995) – Eugenie Kolchenko
Submission (1995 short)
Leaving Las Vegas (1995) – Terri
Four Rooms (1995) – Athena (segment "The Missing Ingredient")
Il fratello minore (1996 short) – Valeria
Escoriandoli (1996) – Ida
Escape from L.A. (1996) – Taslima
I Sfagi tou kokora (1996)
An Occasional Hell (1996) – Elizabeth Laughton
Le acrobate (1997) – Maria
Nostalgia di protezione (1997 short) – Secretary
Shooting the Moon (1998) – Silvia
Side Streets (1998) – Sylvie Otti
Spanish Judges (1999) – Jamie
Alexandria Hotel (TV mini-series) – episode L'alibi (1999) – Justine
La vita che verrà (1999 TV mini-series) – Nunzia
Harem Suare (1999) – Anita
Tipota (1999 short) – Actress
To Tama (2000)
Things You Can Tell Just by Looking at Her (2000) – Lilly (segment "Goodnight Lilly, Goodnight Christine")
Ivans Xtc (2000) – Constanza Vero
Controvento (2000) – Nina
Hotel (2001) – Italian actress
Winter (2002) – Anna
Respiro (2002) – Grazia
Frida (2002) – Lupe Marín
Julius Caesar (2002 TV movie) – Calpurnia
Take Me Away (2003) – Luciana
San-Antonio (2004) – The Italian woman
Alive (2004) – Elisa
36 Quai des Orfèvres (2004) – Camille Vrinks
Mario's War (2005) – Giulia
Texas (2005) – Maria
Olé! (2005) – Carmen Holgado
Solo cinque minuti (2006 short) – Valeria
Our Country (2006) – Rita
Il Sole nero (2007) – Agata
Ma place au soleil (2007)
Don't Waste Your Time, Johnny! (2007)
Actrices (2007) – Natalia Petrovna
The Girl by the Lake (2007) – Chiara Canali
Caos calmo (Quiet Chaos) (2008) – Marta
Cash (2008) – Julia Molina
La Fabbrica dei Tedeschi (2008) – Wife
Giulia Doesn't Date at Night (2009) – Giulia
The Cézanne Affair (2009) – Franca Rossetti
Dark Love (2010) – Psicologa
School Is Over (2010) – Daria Quarenghi
Come un soffio (2010 short) – Hostess
Un Baiser Papillon (2011) – Billie
Kryptonite! (2011) – Rosaria
Nuts (2013) – Giovanna
In Treatment (2013 TV series) – Eleonora
Like the Wind (2013) – Armida Miserere
Human Capital (2014) – Roberta Morelli
Jacky in Women's Kingdom (2014) – Bradi Vune
The Invisible Boy (2014)
An Italian Name (2015)
Per amor vostro (2015)
The Very Private Life of Mister Sim (2015) – Luigia
Il colore nascosto delle cose (2017)
The Summer House (2018) - Elena
Daughter of Mine (2018)
The Invisible Boy - Second Generation (2018)
Adults in the Room (2019)
Volare (2019)
Portrait of a Lady on Fire (2019)
5 Is the Perfect Number (2019)
Casanova, Last Love (2019) – La Cornelys
Last Words (2020)
 (2021)
The Catholic School (2021)
The Morning Show (2021 TV series, Apple TV+)
The Lying Life of Adults (2023 TV series)

Directing
 Armandino e il Madre (2010, short)
 Honey (2013)
 Euphoria (2018)

Music videos
She also appeared in several music videos:

 "Bittersweet Me" by R.E.M. (1996)
 "Piangi Roma" by Baustelle and herself (2009)
 "Va così" by Le Vibrazioni (2011)
 "These Boots Are Made for Walkin" by Planet Funk (2011)

Awards and nominations

See also
 List of female film and television directors

References

External links

 
 

1965 births
Living people
20th-century Italian actresses
21st-century Italian actresses
Italian film actresses
Italian film directors
Italian television actresses
Italian women film directors
Film people from Naples
Actresses from Naples
Italian people of Egyptian descent
Italian people of French descent
Italian people of Greek descent
Expatriate actresses in the United States
David di Donatello winners
Nastro d'Argento winners
Ciak d'oro winners
Volpi Cup for Best Actress winners